Dalla superargentea is a species of butterfly in the family Hesperiidae. It is found in Venezuela and Colombia.

References

Butterflies described in 2008
superargentea